KF Veleçiku is an Albanian football club based in the city of Koplik, in the Malësi e Madhe District. Their home ground is the Kompleksi Vellezërit Duli and they currently compete in the Kategoria e Dytë.

Honours
Albanian Second Division
Winner (2)
Runners-up (1): 2012–13

Current squad

External links
Soccerway
Panorama Sport

Football clubs in Albania
Association football clubs established in 1948
1948 establishments in Albania
Malësi e Madhe
Kategoria e Dytë clubs